This article lists the diplomatic missions in Transnistria. Transnistria is a state with limited recognition, that broke away from Moldova after the War of Transnistria in 1992. Transnistria did not receive recognition from any UN member states. It has been recognized as independent state by Abkhazia, Nagorno-Karabakh and South Ossetia only. At present, the capital Tiraspol hosts no embassies, but two representative offices and one consulate.

Embassies 
Tiraspol
 none

Representative offices 
Tiraspol

Consulates 
Tiraspol

 (Consular office)

See also 
Foreign relations of Transnistria
List of diplomatic missions of Transnistria

References

External links 
 Ministry of Foreign Affairs of Pridnestrovian Moldavian Republic

Diplomatic missions in
Transnistria
Diplomatic missions in Transnistria
Diplomatic missions